Theo Heffernan Vukašinović (born 25 June 1996) is an English rugby union lock. He appeared 19 times for RFU Championship club London Scottish in the 2018/19 season. Ahead of the 2019/2020 season he joined Premiership Rugby team Wasps RFC.

Early life 
Vukašinović was born on 25 June 1996 in Wandsworth, London. He attended Reed's School in Cobham, Surrey, England. While there, he played Under 18 representative rugby for London Irish. He signed a one-year Senior Academy contract with them in 2014, and made his Senior debut for them in November against Wasps RFC in the Anglo-Welsh Cup.

The following year he declined a further contract with London Irish, instead continuing his academic studies at Loughborough University. He played for the university in rugby union National League 1 and in the British Universities and Colleges Sport (BUCS) Super Rugby. BUCS Super Rugby colour commentators described him as a "modern-day second row" and a "great all round athlete". He was included in the training squad for England Students in 2018.

Rugby career
On graduation, Vukašinović rejoined professional rugby, agreeing a contract with RFU Championship club London Scottish for the 2018/19 season. He appeared 19 times for them. In May 2019, he joined Premiership Rugby team Wasps RFC for the 2019/2020 season. Wasps entered administration on 17 October 2022 and Vukašinović was made redundant along with all other players and coaching staff. On 2 November 2022, Vuksinovic signed for Doncaster Knights in the RFU Championship for the 2022-23 season.

References 

1996 births
Living people
English rugby union players
Rugby union locks
Rugby union players from Wandsworth
Wasps RFC players
London Scottish F.C. players
London Irish players
People educated at Reed's School
Ampthill RUFC players